Panther: Hindustan Meri Jaan is a 2019 Indian Bengali-language  action thriller film directed by debutant Anshuman Pratyush while story, screenplay and dialogues were written by Anshuman Pratyush and Prameet and co-written by Jeet . The film features Jeet and Shraddha Das in the lead roles. It got overwhelmingly negative reviews from critics, though appreciated by major of the audiences

Cast

 Jeet as Panther, a highly trained RAW agent considered one of the agency's best.
 Shraddha Das as Zia, daughter of Jahangir, a dance teacher in a school of Kolkata
 Saswata Chatterjee as Spyder, a RAW agent who handles technical aspects
 Sourav Chakraborty as Afzal Faridi, Deputy Chief of Fictional Terrorist Group Isbul Al-Qaeda
 Shantilal Mukherjee as Jahangir/Firoz Khan
  Sudeep Mukherjee  as Francis D'Costa, RAW personnel
 Rupanjana Mitra as Defence Ministry personnel, a very close person to the Prime Minister
 Kanchan Mallick as Jhumjhum, a RAW agent based in Tehrikistan
  Biswarup Biswas  as Yakub Habibi, Isbul Al-Qaeda Chief
  Pradip Dhar  as Moulana Salim Reza, a terrorist who disguises himself as an antic shop owner in the Chorabazar area
 Aryann Roy as Aman Hassan,Afzal's henchman
 Neil Chatterjee as Samir Hassan,Aman's younger brother

Release
The film released on 9 August 2019.

Soundtrack

The soundtrack is composed by Savvy, Suddho Roy, Amit–Ishan and lyrics by Bankim Chandra Chatterjee, Ritam Sen and Suddho Roy.

References

External links
 

2019 films
Indian action thriller films
2010s spy thriller films
2019 action thriller films
Bengali-language Indian films
2010s Bengali-language films
Films about terrorism in India
Films about the Research and Analysis Wing
Indian spy thriller films